Lisa Marie Armstrong (born 25 October 1976) is a former member of pop band Deuce and was make-up expert for the ITV programme This Morning, until becoming make-up supervisor for the ITV quiz show Pick Me and its prime-time entertainment series Ant & Dec's Saturday Night Takeaway.

Early life
Armstrong was born and brought up in Blackbird Leys, Oxford, England, living with her parents and one older brother Stephen. She attended Peers School, Oxford, but at the age of 14 won a place at BRIT School for Performing Arts & Technology in Croydon, south London.

Career
Armstrong started her career as a dancer from an early age but when her friend, Kelly O'Keefe had work experience with a music management company and was asked to put together a band, she joined Deuce alongside Kelly O'Keefe, Craig Young and Paul Holmes. Their debut single, "Call It Love" was released in January 1995, entered the UK charts at number 21 and worked its way up to peak at number 11. The band went on to release two more singles and an album before O'Keefe decided to leave the band in November 1995 and the band were dropped from their label. The band decided to continue on a new label and O'Keefe was replaced by Amanda Perkins, for one single, before they disbanded.

She then chose to train as a make-up artist, writing a column for Cosmopolitan magazine before becoming the make-up artist for many British television shows such as The X Factor, Britain's Got Talent and many of Ant & Dec's shows. Armstrong was also the make-up expert on This Morning, giving makeovers and short make-up tutorials.

She is now head of make-up and hair for BBC One's Strictly Come Dancing.

In 2020, she was one of the Guest Judges on make up competition show Glow Up: Britain's Next Make-Up Star on Series 2, Episode 6.

Personal life
On 22 July 2006, Armstrong married her longtime boyfriend Ant McPartlin at Cliveden, a country house hotel in Buckinghamshire. The couple were married for 11 years, before announcing in January 2018 that they were divorcing.

References

1976 births
Living people
British make-up artists
People from Oxford
People educated at the BRIT School
English women pop singers
21st-century English women singers
21st-century English singers